Jill Yulo (born December 28, 1989) is a Filipina actress who is a member of Star Magic, ABS-CBN's talent management and development center. She starred in Star Cinema's D'Anothers and was a finalist, with Alwyn Uytingco, on Qpids. She recently starred in the ABS-CBN soap opera Maria Flordeluna with Alwyn Uytingco.

Filmography

Television
 Reputasyon (2011–12) as Nina
 Maalaala Mo Kaya
 Episode: "Dalandan" (2008) as Young Cathy
 Pedro Penduko at ang mga Engkantao (2007)
 Episode: "Saranggay" (2007) as Jane
 Maria Flordeluna (2007) as Annie Natividad
 Star Magic Presents: Abt Ur Luv (2007)
 Maalaala Mo Kaya
 Episode: "Cellphone" (2007) as Sheryl Gavito (Lead)
 Your Song: Ang Soundtrack ng LoveLife mo! (2006)
 Episode: "Panalangin" (2006)
 Maalaala Mo Kaya
 Episode: "Balabal" (2006) as Baby
 Episode: "Salamin" (2006) as Carlotta
 Episode: "Palaisdaan" (2006) as Rose
 Star Magic Presents
 Episode: "Sabihin Mo Lang" (2006) as Belle
 Episode: "Love Chop" (2006)
Komiks
 Episode: "Bunsong Kerubin" (2006)
 ASAP (2004–07) Herself / Performer
 Qpids (2005) herself
 Sarah The Teen Princess (2004) as Alice

Films
 A Secret Affair (2012) as Katie
 Tiyanaks (2007) as Hanz
 Happy Hearts (2007) as Margot
 D'Anothers (2005)
 Spirit of the Glass (2004)

External links
 

1989 births
Filipino child actresses
Filipino film actresses
Filipino television actresses
Participants in Philippine reality television series
Living people
Star Magic